The Bannu Resolution, or the Pashtunistan Resolution, was a formal political statement adopted by Pashtun tribesmen who had wanted an independent Pashtun state on 21 June 1947 in Bannu in the North-West Frontier Province of British India (in present-day Khyber Pakhtunkhwa, Pakistan). The resolution demanded the British to offer the option of independence for Pashtunistan, comprising all Pashtun territories in British India, rather than choosing between the independent dominions of India and Pakistan. 

The British, however, refused the request and the North-West Frontier Province was joined with Pakistan on July 1947 NWFP referendum. However, Bacha Khan, his elder brother and then Chief Minister Dr Khan Sahib, and the Khudai Khidmatgars, as well as Many Pashtun tribes of North-West Frontier Province boycotted the referendum in response, citing that it did not have the options of the NWFP becoming independent or joining Afghanistan.

History 
The resolution was adopted on 21 June 1947, seven weeks before the Partition of British India, by Bacha Khan, Abdul Samad Khan Achakzai, the Khudai Khidmatgars, members of the Provincial Assembly, Mirzali Khan (Faqir of Ipi), and other tribal chiefs at a loya jirga held at Bannu, in British India’s North-West Frontier Province.

The resolution demanded that Pashtuns be given a choice to have an independent state of Pashtunistan, composing all Pashtun territories of British India - an exemption from the British plan to award territories in British India to either Pakistan or India.

British refusal 
Under Clement Attlee, the British Raj refused to consider the resolution's demands,  because in July 1947, the Parliament of the United Kingdom passed the Indian Independence Act 1947 declaring that by 15 August 1947 it would divide British India into the two new independent dominions of India and Pakistan with no option for further independent states.

The act also declared that the fate of the North West Frontier Province would be subject to the result of referendum. This was in accord with the June 3rd Plan proposal to have a referendum to decide the future of the Northwest Frontier Province—to be voted on by the same electoral college as for the Provincial Legislative Assembly in 1946.

1947 NWFP referendum 

The voters voted overwhelmingly in favour of Pakistan versus India in the referendum held in the North-West Frontier Province in July 1947. 289,244 (99.02%) votes were cast in favour of Pakistan.

See also
Khudai Khidmatgar
Pashtunistan
Pashtun nationalism
Durand Line

References

1947 in British India
Durand Line
Pashtun nationalism
1947 documents